ATP-binding cassette transporter sub-family C member 11, also MRP8 (Multidrug Resistance-Related Protein 8) is a membrane transporter that exports certain molecules from inside a cell. It is a protein that in humans is encoded by gene ABCC11.

The gene is responsible for determination of human cerumen type (wet or dry ear wax) and presence of underarm osmidrosis (odor associated with sweat caused by excessive apocrine secretion).

Function 

The protein encoded by this gene is a member of the superfamily of ATP-binding cassette (ABC) transporters. ABC proteins transport various molecules across extra- and intra-cellular membranes. ABC genes are divided into seven distinct subfamilies (ABC1, MDR/TAP, MRP, ALD, OABP, GCN20, White). The ABCC11 transporter is a member of the MRP subfamily which is involved in multi-drug resistance. The product of this gene participates in physiological processes involving bile acids, conjugated steroids, and cyclic nucleotides. In addition, a single nucleotide polymorphism (SNP) in this gene is responsible for determination of human earwax type and presence of underarm odour. This gene and family member ABCC12 are determined to be derived by duplication and are both localized to chromosome 16q12.1. Multiple alternatively spliced transcript variants have been described for this gene.

Molecular genetics 

The ABCC11 gene is present in the human genome as two alleles, differing in one nucleotide also known as a single nucleotide polymorphism (SNP). A SNP in the ABCC11 gene on chromosome 16 at base position 538 of either a guanine or adenine determines two distinct groups of phenotypes. These respectively code for glycine and arginine in the gene's protein product. Dominant inheritance of the GG or GA genotype is observed while the AA genotype is recessive. The phenotypes expressed by the genotypes include cerumen type (wet or dry ear wax), osmidrosis (odor associated with sweat caused by excessive apocrine secretion), and possibly breast cancer risk, although there is ongoing debate on whether there is a real correlation of the wet ear wax phenotype to breast cancer susceptibility. The GG or GA genotype produces the wet ear wax phenotype (sticky and brown colored) and acrid sweat odor and is the dominant allele. Note this phenotype requires only the presence of one guanine. The homozygous recessive AA genotype produces the dry ear wax phenotype (dry and flaky) and mildly odored sweat.

The alleles containing a guanine produce a protein that is glycosylated but alleles containing an adenine are not glycosylated. The resulting protein is only partially degraded by proteasomes. This effect is localized to ceruminous gland membranes. Because the adenine containing allele protein product is only partially degraded, the remaining functional protein is located on the cell surface membrane which ABCC11 gene's role in sweat odor is likely in part due to the quantitative dosage of ABCC11 protein.

From an evolutionary perspective, the implications of cerumen type on fitness are unknown. However, odorless sweat in ancient Northern Eurasian populations has been postulated to have an adaptive advantage for cold weather. In some nonhuman mammals, mating signals via release of an odor enhanced by increased apocrine secretion may be a factor in sexual selection.

Physical human traits that are controlled by a single gene are uncommon. Most human characteristics are controlled by multiple genes (polygenes); ABCC11 is a peculiar example of a gene with unambiguous phenotypes that is controlled by a SNP. Additionally, it is considered a pleiotropic gene.

Demographics 

The history of the migration of humans can be traced back using the ABCC11 gene alleles. The variation between ear wax in ethnicities around the world are specifically due to the ABCC11 gene alleles.  It is believed the allele originated in ancient East Asian population. The gene may have spread as a result of it being a beneficial adaption or through an evolutionary neutral mutation mechanism that went through genetic drift events, or through sexual selection.

The frequency of alleles for dry ear wax is most concentrated in East- and Northeast Asia, most notably Korea, China, Mongolia, and Japan. The allele frequency is highest among northern Han Chinese and Koreans, followed by Mongolians, southern Han Chinese, and Yamato Japanese, respectively. The frequency is low among the Ryukyuans and Ainu. A downward gradient of dry ear wax allele phenotypes can be drawn from northern China to southern Asia and an east–west gradient can also be drawn from eastern Siberia to western Europe. The allele frequencies within ethnicities continued to be maintained because the ABCC11 gene is inherited as a haplotype, a group of genes or alleles that tend to be inherited as a single unit

The amount of volatile organic compounds (VOCs) in ear wax was found to be related to variation in ABCC11 genotype, which in turn is dependent on ethnic origin.  In particular, the rs17822931 genotype, which is especially prevalent in East Asians, is correlated with lower VOC levels. However, VOC levels were not found to vary significantly qualitatively nor quantitatively for most organic compounds by racial group after Bonferroni corrections, suggesting that it does not result in ethnic differences.

See also 
 ATP-binding cassette transporter
Body odor

References

Citations

Sources

Further reading

External links

ATP-binding cassette transporters